At the 2004 Pan Arab Games, the athletics events were held at the Stade 5 Juillet 1962 in Algiers, Algeria from 4 to 8 October. A total of 45 events were contested, of which 23 by male and 22 by female athletes. The host country topped the medal table having won a 16 gold medals and 34 medals overall. Second placed Morocco, with seven golds, had the greatest number of medals overall with a total of 35. Tunisia was third with sixteen medals in total, seven of which were gold.  Eleven new Games records were set over the course of the five-day competition.

Baya Rahouli—an Algiers native and 2004 Summer Olympics finalist—was the most successful athlete of the Games, winning four golds (100 metres, 100 metres hurdles, long jump and triple jump) and setting two Games records. Seventeen-year-old Mona Jabir Adam Ahmed of Sudan won the 400 metres in personal best time, and also won a 200 metres silver. Todd Matthews-Jouda, a former American athlete, appeared to break the African record in the 110 metres hurdles, but this was later revised to 13.45 seconds – a Games record regardless. Hamed Hamadan Al-Bishi set a personal best for the 200 m Pan Arab title and went on to help both the Saudi Arabian relay teams to gold medals.

Algerian Nahida Touhami won two golds in the women's 800 metres and 1500 metres while long-distance compatriot Souad Aït Salem went one further, doing a 5000/10,000 metres double before taking a third gold in the half marathon. Amina Aït Hammou of Morocco won two silver medals in the women's 400 m and 800 m events. The women on the heptathlon podium all repeated their combined events medals in the individual disciplines. The event winner—Sarah Bouaoudia—set a Games record to win the high jump, runner-up Imen Chatbri took another silver in the javelin, while bronze medallist Zahra Lachguer was also third in the 400 metres hurdles.

Records
In addition to the records set by medalling athletes at the 2004 Games, the following records were set by others competing in Algiers:

Medal summary

Men

Women

AR † = Arab record

Medal table

Participation
A total of 20 countries were represented in the athletics competition. Of the countries which had previously competed at the Pan Arab Games, Somalia and Comoros were the two nations which were not represented in the competition.

References

Results
10e Jeux PANARABES. Fédération Tunisienne d'Athlétisme. Retrieved on 2010-07-17.
Daily reports
Aldama beaten by Rahouli in Pan-Arab Games - Day One. IAAF (2004-10-05). Retrieved on 2010-07-18.
Saudi and Sudanese one-lap stars celebrate in Pan-Arab Games - Day Two. IAAF (2004-10-06). Retrieved on 2010-07-18.
Rahouli triumphs with third gold in Pan-Arab Games – Day 3. IAAF (2004-10-07). Retrieved on 2010-07-18.
Matthews hurdles 13.21, Kamel wins 800m, Al Bishi doubles, and Rahouli takes fourth title in Pan-Arab Games – Day 4. IAAF (2004-10-08). Retrieved on 2010-07-18.
Moroccan and Algerian half marathon victories close Pan-Arab Games - Final Day. IAAF (2004-10-09). Retrieved on 2010-07-18.

External links
Archived website 
All Pan Arab champions from GBR Athletics

2004 Pan Arab Games
Pan Arab Games
2004
2004